NGC 4730 is a lenticular galaxy located about 160 million light-years away in the constellation Centaurus. NGC 4730 was discovered by astronomer John Herschel on June 8, 1834. NGC 4730 is a member of the Centaurus Cluster.

See also 
 List of NGC objects (4001–5000)

References

External links

Centaurus (constellation)
Lenticular galaxies
4730 
43611 
Centaurus Cluster
Astronomical objects discovered in 1834